is a strategy game loosely based on the Three Kingdoms period of China. It is the sequel to Kessen in name only; both Kessen and the later sequel Kessen III are based on events in Japan and China. The gameplay involves playing out major battles as the storyline progresses, with cutscenes between each battle for the development of the events and major characters. Before battle, players are given a choice of strategies to take, although they can manually control all units in the battlefield. All units are controlled by the AI unless the player directly intervenes, and battles between forces are carried out in real-time. While in control of a unit, players are able to use special skills or magic spells to turn the tables, although enemy characters are also able to do so.

Unlike Koei's other games based on the 14th century novel Romance of the Three Kingdoms (Dynasty Warriors and the Romance of the Three Kingdoms game), the plot of Kessen II is a heavily fantasized version of the novel. The last of the Han dynasty family, Liu Bei, begins a rebellion against the kingdom of Wei led by Cao Cao, with much of the game's events being based on the novel with alterations due to the different storylines. A significant change to the story involves a romance between Liu Bei and the character Diao Chan, being a significant factor behind Liu Bei's decision to go to war, and Himiko, a semi-fictional sorceress (the historical Himiko ruled Wa [ancient Japan]). In addition to the fantasized theme, Kessen II departs from its realistic predecessor. Koei introduces elements of magic, especially with the portrayal of notable strategists such as Zhuge Liang and Sima Yi as sorcerers. In battle, these characters are able to cause earthquakes, summon lightning storms and hurl fireballs.

Characters 
The majority of characters are loosely based on characters found in the Chinese epic Romance of the Three Kingdoms.

Liu Bei's Forces (Shu) 

 Liu Bei - Leader of the Shu forces and Lord of Xu. Lover of Diao Chan and unwilling ruler.
 Mei Sanniang - Long-time female friend of Liu Bei. Described as reckless and a beauty. Her character was created for the game and is a heavily fictionalized combination and interpretation of Lady Mi and Hu Sanniang.
 Guan Yu - Sworn brother of Liu Bei and Zhang Fei. Wields the Black Dragon and Liu Bei's greatest warrior.

 Zhang Fei - Sworn brother of Liu Bei and Guan Yu. Former bandit who is hot-tempered and overfond of drinking.
 Zhuge Liang - Initially "unaligned" in the conflict he later becomes Liu Bei's main advisor and warlord. One of the most powerful magicians in the game.
 Zhao Yun - Head of the Han Imperial Bodyguard. Joins Liu Bei with the hope of restoring the Han Empire.
 Diao Chan - Lover of Liu Bei, kidnapped at the start of the game by Cao Cao because she alone knows where the Mandate of Heaven exists.
 Li Li, Mei Mei and Luo Luo -  Daughters of the Zhang Fei. Mei Mei is killed off-screen at the beginning of the game by Cao Cao's forces. Loosely based on Zhang's historical daughters Empress Jing'ai & Empress Zhang.
 Guan Ping - Adopted son of Guan Yu.
 Zhou Cang - General of Liu Bei who helps turn the tide against Cao Cao.
 Pang Tong - Sworn brother of Zhuge Liang. A powerful magician.
 Huang Zhong - Master of the bow and former officer of Liu Biao
 Cai Mao - Former officer of Cao Cao who gets tricked into joining Liu Bei.
 Ma Su - The Hero of Jin, a magician
 Sun Li - Sister of Sun Quan, falls in love with Liu Bei and abandons her brother. Based on the historical Lady Sun.
 Wei Yan - Native of Jing who joins Liu Bei after the Battle of Fan Zheng.
 Jiang Wei - General who joins Liu Bei at the Battle of Tian Shui.
 Xu Shu - Magician serving under Cao Cao who defects to Liu Bei.
 Huang Yue-Ying - Eccentric wife of Zhuge Liang. Invents weapons and new equipment for Liu Bei.

Cao Cao's Forces (Wei) 

 Cao Cao - Leader of the Wei forces. Former officer for the Han Empire who has set out to conquer the world.
 Himiko - Powerful sorcerer from a foreign land who serves Cao Cao. Jealous of Diao Chan.
 Xun Yu - Female version of the historical Xun Yu. Cao Cao's main warlord and advisor. A powerful magician.
 Hu Zhi - One of Cao Cao's strongest generals. Good friends with Himiko. A female version of Xu Chu. 
 Sima Yi - A wandering hermit who joins with Cao Cao later in the game to become his advisor and warlord. One of the most powerful magicians in the game.
 Xiahou Yuan - Cao Cao's most powerful general and warrior. Killed by Zhang Fei in a duel in the early parts of the game.
 Cheng Yu - Warlord of Cao Cao who is constantly playing the role of "scheming villain". A powerful magician.
 Cao Ren - Powerful general and relative of Cao Cao.
 Zhang Liao - Trusted general of Cao Cao. Has a rivalry with Guan Yu since they used to be close friends, but fell out after a duel over a woman.
 Yu Jin - General of Cao Cao who is overly flamboyant and portrayed as a joke. Famous for running away. Attracted to Cao Cao for his "manliness" and portrayed as a queer character.
 Guo Jia - Hermit who joins Cao Cao on the suggestion of Xun Yu.
 Cao Hong - Officer and relative of Cao Cao with little to no character.
 Xiahou Ba - Eldest son (historically the second son) of Xiahou Yuan. Tries to live up to his father.
 Cao Bu - Uncle of Cao Cao who tries to get Cao Cao to return to a way of peace. A fictional character loosely based on the historical Cao Song, father of Cao Cao.
 Dong Xuanfeng & Xi Xuanfeng - Two female warriors and assassins who work for Cao Cao's general Yu Jin. Two original characters created for the game.
 Yue Jin - Officer of Cao Cao, both he and Li Dian are portrayed as insecure.
 Li Dian - Officer of Cao Cao, both he and Yue Jin are portrayed as insecure.
 Xu Huang - Former officer of the Han Empire who is recruited to Cao Cao's cause.
 Zhang He - A strange masked officer serving Cao Cao.
 Xiahou Dun - One-eyed warrior who is the brother to Xiahou Yuan.
 Guo Shao - Officer who joins Cao Cao at the Battle of Tian Shui. Based on the historical general Hao Zhao.

Sun Quan's Forces (Wu) 

 Sun Quan - Ruler of Wu, his main focus is defending his territory.
 Zhou Yu - The main warlord of Wu and advisor to Sun Quan.
 Gan Ning - Wu's most powerful general and a former pirate.
 Lu Meng - Magician serving Sun Quan.
 Lu Su - Magician serving Sun Quan.
 Lu Xun - Magician serving Sun Quan
 Taishi Ci - Officer serving Sun Quan.

Other

Forces of Xi 

 Cai Wengi - Ruler of the Northern Xi. A powerful general and magician. Can join either Cao Cao or Liu Bei depending on who defeats her. She is a highly fictionalized version of the historical poet and writer Cai Yan.
 Deng Ai - Officer under Cai Wengi and Ma Chao. Defects to Cao Cao.
 Ma Chao - Ruler of Western Xi. Joins Liu Bei after a failed attack on Cao Cao.
 Ma Dai - Officer under Cai Wengi and Ma Chao. Defects to Liu Bei.
 Pang De - Officer under Ma Chao, joins Cao Cao after the Battle of Tong Gate.

Forces of Liu Zhang 

 Liu Zhang - Ruler of the Yi Province. An old warrior and friend of Cao Bu.
 Fa Zheng - Advisor to Liu Zhang who joins Liu Bei after Liu Zhang is defeated. A powerful magician.
 Yan Yan - General of Liu Zhang who is tricked into joining Liu Bei by Zhao Yun.
 Wu Yi - Officer of Liu Zhang
 Zhang Ren - Officer of Liu Zhang

Forces of Meng Huo 

 Meng Huo - King of southern Yi. Dominated by his wife Zhu Rong.
 Zhu Rong - Queen of southern Yi. Advisor and the true ruler. Joins Liu Bei after she and Meng Huo is defeated.
 King Mulu - General under Meng Huo. A magician.
 Wu Tugu - General under Meng Huo
 King Duosi - General under Meng Huo. A magician.

Miscellaneous 

 Liu Biao - Mentioned but not seen, later conquered by Cao Cao off-screen.
 Yuan Shao - Mentioned but not seen, later conquered by Cao Cao off-screen.

Battles 
The game portrays the following historical battles and conflicts in a highly condensed and fictionalized version.

 Cao Cao's invasion of Xu Province - named the Battle of Xu
 Battle of Bowang - named the Battle of Bo Wan Po
 Battle of Changban - Named the Battle of Chang Ban Po
 Battle of Red Cliffs - Named Showdown at Chi Bi
 Liu Bei's takeover of Yi Province - Named the Siege of Cheng Du
 Battle of Mt. Dingjun - named Mt. Dinjun
 Southern Campaign
 Battle of Fancheng - named Battle of Fan Zheng
 Battle of Tong Pass - named Battle of Tong Gate
 Tianshui revolts - named Battle of Tian Shui
 Siege of Chencang - named Defense of Chen Cang
 Lü Meng's Invasion of Jing Province - named Battle of Wu Chang (Liu Bei)
 Cao Pi's invasion of Eastern Wu - named Battle of Wu Chang (Cao Cao)
 Zhuge Liang's Northern Expeditions - named Wei-Shu Conflict

Reception

The game received "average" reviews, according to video game review score aggregator Metacritic. In Japan, Famitsu gave it a score of 35 out of 40.

References

External links 
 

2001 video games
PlayStation 2 games
PlayStation Network games
Video games based on Romance of the Three Kingdoms
Video games developed in Japan
THQ games
Koei games
Single-player video games
Real-time tactics video games